This is a list of List A cricket records; that is, world-record team and individual performances in List A cricket.

Batting records

Most runs in a career

Most centuries in a career

Most half centuries in a career

Most 50+ Score in a career

Highest individual scores

Highest average 
Qualification: 
Minimum 50 innings

Most Runs in an over

Record partnerships by wicket

Bowling records

Most wickets

Most five wickets in an innings

Best bowling figures

Best career bowling average

Best career bowling strike rate

Most games in a career

Most dismissals in a career

Most Catches in a career

Most Stumpings in a career

Highest team scores

Lowest team scores 
Only completed innings are listed:

Largest successful run chases 
50 over cricket

40 over cricket

References

External links
Cricket Archive 
Records for List A matches ESPNcricinfo

List A cricket records
List of List A cricket records
List of List A cricket records